The flat-skulled shrew (Sorex roboratus) is a species of mammal in the family Soricidae. It is found in Mongolia, China and Russia.

References

Sorex
Taxonomy articles created by Polbot
Mammals described in 1913